The attack on the shrine of seven Dujai was an attack on Friday, July 8, 2016, and claimed the lives of 36 people, following two bombings at least in the vicinity of the shrine of Sayed Mohammad in the southern Saladin Governorate, north of Baghdad. It is suspected that the ISIS terrorist organisation targeted the shrine with rocket-propelled mortars, followed by three suicide bombers, two of which detonated in a market near the shrine.

Background
The attack came as the United Nations issued warnings of the possibility of renewed sectarian fighting after the invasion of Iraq in 2003.

References

2016 murders in Iraq
21st-century mass murder in Iraq
Mass shootings in Iraq
ISIL terrorist incidents
Islamic terrorist incidents in 2016 
Mass murder in Iraq
Mass murder in 2016
Suicide bombings in Iraq
Terrorist incidents in Iraq in 2016
Balad, Iraq
July 2016 crimes in Asia